Quinni-Con was an annual two-day anime fan convention held during March or April at the Rocky Top Student Center on the Quinnipiac University York Hill Campus in Hamden, Connecticut, United States. The convention featured a number of events which included a tea café, video programming rooms, a dealers' alley (combination artists' and vendors' alley), guest speakers, a video game room, and a dance. Quinni-Con was created and run by the Quinnipiac University Anime Club, and the name of the event is derived from the school.

History
The first Quinni-Con was held in 2012. The Quinnipiac Anime Club is responsible for conceptualizing, coordinating, and running the convention. The event has not charged for admittance or hospitality, instead collecting donations for Child's Play. The 2015 convention was cancelled due to problems including location availability. A larger venue was announced for 2016's convention - the CoCo Key Water Resort/Hotel Convention Center in Waterbury, CT. However, the convention that year was cancelled as well six days before it was scheduled to be held, citing planning issues and the looming closure of the venue.

Event History

See also
List of anime conventions

References

External links
Quinni-Con Website
Official Quinni-Con Twitter Page

Defunct anime conventions
Recurring events established in 2012
Annual events in Connecticut
Conventions in Connecticut
Connecticut culture
Quinnipiac University
Hamden, Connecticut